Florian Tudor (born 23 May 1973 in Brăila) is a Romanian rower. He competed in the Men's eight at the 2000 Summer Olympics.

References

External links 
 

1973 births
Living people
Romanian male rowers
Sportspeople from Brăila
Olympic rowers of Romania
Rowers at the 2000 Summer Olympics
World Rowing Championships medalists for Romania